Dymitr of Sienno was a 15th-century Polish nobleman of the Dębno coat of arms. He was Castellan of Sanok, Pastor of Skalbmierz, Canon of Kraków (1452) and Gniezno Cathedral (1454), and the heir to the Rymanów Castle.

His mother was Catherine of Oleśnica daughter of Dmitry of Goraj, and his father was Dobiesław of Oleśnica. He was also nephew of Cardinal Zbigniew Oleśnicki.

References

15th-century Polish nobility
Oleśnicki